"Come on Over" is a song written by Deborah Andrews, Martin Harrington, and Ash Howes for former Hear'Say member Kym Marsh's debut album, Standing Tall (2003). It was released as the second solo single on 7 July 2003 in the United Kingdom and peaked number 10 on the UK Singles Chart.

Track listings
UK CD1
 "Come on Over" (album version)
 "Forever"
 "Cry" (acoustic version)
 "Come on Over" (video)

UK CD2
 "Come on Over" (radio edit)
 "Come on Over" (Almighty mix)
 "Come on Over" (Illicit mix)

UK cassette single
 "Come on Over" (radio edit)
 "Forever"
 "Come on Over" (Illicit mix)

Charts

References

2003 singles
2003 songs
Island Records singles
Kym Marsh songs
Songs written by Ash Howes
Songs written by Martin Harrington
Universal Records singles